Zygmunt Kukla (21 January 1948 – 18 May 2016) was a Polish footballer. During his club career he played for Stal Mielec and Apollon Athens.

International career
He played for the Poland national football team and participated in the 1978 FIFA World Cup.

International

References

External links

1948 births
2016 deaths
People from Nysa, Poland
Sportspeople from Podkarpackie Voivodeship
Association football goalkeepers
Polish footballers
Poland international footballers
1978 FIFA World Cup players
Stal Mielec players
Apollon Smyrnis F.C. players
Polish expatriate footballers
Expatriate footballers in Greece